Sebastian Koch-Hansen (born June 19, 1984) is a Danish handball player, currently playing for Liga ASOBAL side CAI BM Aragón. He is the older brother of fellow FCK Håndbold player Nikolaj Koch-Hansen.

Sebastian graduated magna cum laude from Copenhagen Business School.

He is now currently employed by Energitilsynet.

He now lives a quiet family life with his loving girlfriend and young child in Northwestern Copenhagen

External links
 Player info

1984 births
Living people
Danish male handball players
Liga ASOBAL players